Hannah Rose Fierman is an English-born American actress best known for her role as Lily the succubus in V/H/S (2012) and Siren (2016).

Biography
Hannah Fierman began acting at the age of three for theater before showing an interest in film and television. She had since racked up a large filmography and has "never stopped". She started gaining recognition in the horror genre with her performance as Lily in the horror anthology V/H/S for the segment "Amateur Night". On being cast, Fierman admitted that the concept confused her somewhat, "You know, somebody comes up to you and says, ‘Hey, want to be a naked demon girl in my movie?’ It's like, Gosh, do I? But David is such an amazing storyteller. It was so interesting the way he described it...I thought he was a brilliant director." She also found the character sympathetic, "I wanted the viewer to be on her team even after the savagery or at least be understanding of why she did it." She would reprise her role in Siren, loosely based on the segment. Fierman continued her role in horror related projects such as Dead by Midnight as a headlined actress.

Hannah later guest starred in the Creepshow episode "Night of the Living Late Show" as her rendition of Countess Irina Petrovska from Horror Express. Then she guest-starred as Fawn in the episode "Familiar".

In April 2022, Fierman wrote, directed, and starred in the music video for the song "Hair" from the band The Lucid.

Filmography

Accolades

References

External links

Living people
21st-century American actresses
English film actresses
American film actresses
Year of birth missing (living people)